RAF Upottery (also known as Smeatharpe) is a former World War II airfield in East Devon, England.

Opened in 1944, it was used by the Royal Air Force, United States Army Air Forces (USAAF) and United States Navy.  During the war it was used primarily as a transport airfield and for antisubmarine patrols.  It was closed in 1948 after the end of the war and today the remains of the airfield are located on private property being used as agricultural fields.

Upottery received much attention in 2001 when it appeared in the first episode of the television mini-series Band of Brothers. It was from Upottery that Easy Company of the 506th Parachute Infantry Regiment, 101st Airborne Division boarded Douglas C-47 transports and made their first combat jump into Normandy on 6 June 1944.

U.S. Army Air Forces use
Officially opened on 17 February 1944, it was known as AAF-462 for security reasons during the war, and by which it was referred to instead of by its location. Its ID code was "UO".

439th Troop Carrier Group 
The 439th Troop Carrier Group and its four squadrons arrived in England on 10 March 1944 and were based at RAF Balderton, Nottinghamshire, England. The group was equipped with about 70 Douglas C-47 Skytrains and was assigned to the 50th Troop Carrier Wing, IX Troop Carrier Command, Ninth Air Force. The four squadrons assigned to the group and their squadron fuselage codes were:

 91st Troop Carrier Squadron (L4)
 92d Troop Carrier Squadron (J8)
 93d Troop Carrier Squadron (3B)
 94th Troop Carrier Squadron (D8)

The group moved to RAF Upottery on 26 April and trained for the invasion of France. On D-Day, 6 June 1944, the four squadrons dropped paratroopers of the U.S. 101st Airborne Division and released gliders with reinforcements on the following day. The group received two decorations for these actions, a U.S. Distinguished Unit Citation and a French Croix de Guerre with Palm.

After the Normandy invasion the group ferried supplies in the United Kingdom until the air echelons of three squadrons, the 91st, 92d and 94th Troop Carrier Squadrons, began operating from Orbetello Airfield, Italy from 18 July to 24 August. Their mission was to transport cargo to Rome and evacuate wounded personnel. During the invasion of Southern France on 15 August, the three squadron dropped paratroops of the U.S. 517th Parachute Infantry Regiment along the Riviera, and later towed gliders to provide reinforcements. The group was awarded a second French Croix de Guerre for these missions.

The 93d Troop Carrier Squadron had remained in England but operated from RAF Ramsbury, England on 7–16 August, and RAF Membury, England on 16–22 August.

After the air echelon returned to England on 25 August the group resumed its cargo missions until 8 September when the group deployed to Juvincourt Airfield, France, also known as Advanced Landing Ground (ALG) A-68.

USN use
The airfield had been unoccupied since September 1944, and a detachment of SeaBees made it habitable. Two Patrol Bombing Squadrons (VPBs) flying Consolidated PB4Y-1 Liberators (USAAF B-24D, B-24J, B-24L and B-24M aircraft) on antisubmarine warfare patrols were assigned to Naval Air Facility (NAF) Upottery in 1945. The two squadrons were tasked to assist No. 19 Group, RAF Coastal Command in patrols in the English Channel, Irish Sea and Bay of Biscay. NAF Upottery was a satellite field to NAF Dunkeswell, Devon, England and it was returned to RAF control on 31 July 1945.

The two squadrons were:

 VPB-107: This squadron was deployed at NAF Natal, Rio Grande do Norte, Brazil until being ordered to redeploy to NAF Upottery and being assigned to Fleet Air Wing Seven (FAW-7). While operating from NAF Natal, the squadron had sunk five German U-boats operating in the South Atlantic Ocean. Squadron headquarters was established at NAF Upottery on 10 January 1945 and the squadron became operational on 21 January. After the war, the squadron departed England aboard seaplane tender USS Albemarle (AV-5) on 4 June and arrived at Norfolk, Virginia on 14 June.
 VPB-112: This squadron was deployed at NAF Port Lyautey, French Morocco when orders were received to cease operations and prepare to transfer to England. Squadron headquarters were established at NAF Upottery on 9 January 1945 and the squadron was assigned to FAW-7. Operations began from this base on 15 February. With the surrender of Germany the U-boats still at sea began to surrender to the Allies. Three U-boats surrendered to the aircraft of VPB-112: on 9 May U-249 surrendered, on 10 May U-825 surrendered and on 11 May U-516 surrendered. On 5 June, squadron personnel boarded the seaplane tender USS Albemarle (AV-5) which arrived at Norfolk, Virginia on 14 June.

Civil use
Upon its release from military use, the airfield was returned to agriculture.  All three runways remain with most of the concreted areas still intact. Part of the airfield is used by a small flying club and another section is used for stock car racing on a purpose built concrete oval, parts of it are also used for rallying, drag racing and drifting.

Nearby is a free museum featuring a collection of weapons, militaria and documents connected with the D-Day invasion.

See also

Royal Air Force station
List of former Royal Air Force stations
 101st Airborne Division

References

 Freeman, Roger A. (1994) UK Airfields of the Ninth: Then and Now 1994. After the Battle 
 Maurer, Maurer (1983). Air Force Combat Units of World War II. Maxwell AFB, Alabama: Office of Air Force History. .
  Upottery Airfield at ControlTowers.co.uk
  USAAS-USAAC-USAAF-USAF Aircraft Serial Numbers—1908 to present

External links

 World War II Airfields: Photos of RAF Upottery
 Geograph British Isle Project: Photos of RAF Upottery
 Control Towers website: Photos of RAF Upottery

Airfields of the IX Troop Carrier Command in the United Kingdom
Royal Air Force stations in Devon
Military installations established in 1944
Military installations closed in 1945